Brigitte Magnus is a retired East German slalom canoeist who competed in the mid-to-late 1950s. She won two gold medals at the 1957 ICF Canoe Slalom World Championships in Augsburg, earning them in the folding K-1 event and the folding K-1 team event.

References
ICF medalists for Olympic and World Championships - Part 2: rest of flatwater (now sprint) and remaining canoeing disciplines: 1936-2007.

East German female canoeists
Possibly living people
Year of birth missing (living people)
Place of birth missing (living people)
Medalists at the ICF Canoe Slalom World Championships